Raquel Jiménez Cerrillo (born 21 January 1966) is a Mexican politician affiliated with the PAN. She served as Deputy of the LXII Legislature of the Mexican Congress representing Querétaro. Previously, she served as a local deputy in the Congress of Querétaro from 2003 to 2006.

References

1966 births
Living people
Politicians from Guanajuato
People from León, Guanajuato
Women members of the Chamber of Deputies (Mexico)
National Action Party (Mexico) politicians
20th-century Mexican politicians
20th-century Mexican women politicians
21st-century Mexican politicians
21st-century Mexican women politicians
Deputies of the LXII Legislature of Mexico
Members of the Chamber of Deputies (Mexico) for Querétaro
Members of the Congress of Querétaro
Universidad de Guanajuato alumni
Autonomous University of Queretaro alumni